The 2007 FIVB Women's Junior Volleyball World Championship was held in Nakhon Ratchasima, Thailand from July 20 to 27, 2007. 12 teams participated in the tournament.

Qualification process

Pools composition

Preliminary round

Pool A

|}

|}

Pool B

|}

|}

Final round

9th–12th places

Classification 9th and 12th

|}

Classification 11th

|}

Classification 9th

|}

5th–8th places

Classification 5th and 8th

|}

Classification 7th

|}

Classification 5th

|}

Championship round

Semifinals

|}

Bronze medal match

|}

Gold medal match

|}

Final standing

Individual awards

MVP:  Natalia Pereira
Best Scorer:  Natalia Pereira
Best Spiker:  Natalia Pereira
Best Blocker:  Camila Monteiro
Best Server:  Kelly Murphy
Best Setter:  Miho Watanabe
Best Libero:  Camila Brait

References

External links
 Official website.

World Championship
Women's U20 Volleyball World Championship
Volleyball
FIVB Volleyball Women's U20 World Championship
FIVB Women's Junior World Championship
2007 in youth sport